William Samuel Furneaux (2 June 1855, Devonport – 1940) was a British science teacher and nature writer. Furneaux gained considerable fame in the 1890s and early twentieth century for his popular books on butterflies, moths, pond animals, and plants from the English countryside.

According to James Ritchie, Furneaux's books are succinct, well-illustrated, and among the best for stimulating young naturalists.

Works

References

External links

 
 
 Professor Furneaux and the 'Penlees of Felbridge', Felbridge and District History Group
 

1855 births
1940 deaths
British nature writers